The 1992–93 FIS Ski Jumping World Cup was the 14th World Cup season in ski jumping and the 3rd official World Cup season in ski flying. It began in Falun, Sweden on 5 December 1992 and finished in Planica, Slovenia on 28 March 1993. The individual World Cup was won by Andreas Goldberger and Nations Cup by Austria.

Lower competitive circuit this season included the Europa/Continental Cup.

Map of world cup hosts 
All 13 locations which have been hosting world cup events for men this season. Events in Vikersund and Harrachov were completely canceled.

 Four Hills Tournament

Calendar

Men

Men's team

Standings

Overall

Ski Flying

Nations Cup

Four Hills Tournament

References 

World cup
World cup
FIS Ski Jumping World Cup